The 1988 OTB Open was a combined men's and women's tennis tournament played on outdoor hard courts in Schenectady, New York in the United States that was part of the 1988 Nabisco Grand Prix and of the Category 1 tier of the 1988 WTA Tour. It was the second edition of the tournament and ran from July 18 through July 24, 1988.

Finals

Men's singles

 Tim Mayotte defeated  Johan Kriek 5–7, 6–3, 6–2
 It was Mayotte's 2nd title of the year and the 10th of his career.

Women's singles

 Gretchen Magers defeated  Terry Phelps 7–6, 6–4
 It was Magers' only title of the year and the 2nd of her career.

Men's doubles

 Alexander Mronz /  Greg Van Emburgh defeated  Paul Annacone /  Patrick McEnroe 6–3, 6–7, 7–5
 It was Mronz's only title of the year and the 1st of his career. It was Van Emburgh's only title of the year and the 1st of his career.

Women's doubles

 Ann Henricksson /  Julie Richardson defeated  Lea Antonoplis /  Cammy MacGregor 6–3, 3–6, 7–5
 It was Henricksson's 3rd title of the year and the 3rd of her career. It was Richardson's only title of the year and the 5th of her career.

References